Chloroclystis hypotmeta is a moth in the family Geometridae. It was described by Prout in 1934. It is found on Fiji and New Hebrides.

References

External links

Moths described in 1934
hypotmeta
Moths of Fiji